This is a list of fellows of the Royal Society elected in 1695.

Fellows 
Bernard Connor  (1666–1698)
Samuel Doody  (1656–1706)
Charles Montagu 1st Earl of Halifax (1661–1715)
James Petiver  (1663–1718)
Domenico Bottoni  (1641–1721)
Moise Pujolas  (d. 1729)
Tommaso Del Bene  (1652–1739)
Richard Bentley  (1662–1742)

References

1695
1695 in science
1695 in England